Echinorhynchidae is a family of acanthocephalan parasitic worms from the order Echinorhynchida. The adult worms live in the intestines of fishes, amphibians and reptiles.
The family contains the following genera, organised by subfamily.
Circinatechinorhynchinae Bhattacharya, 2007
Circinatechinorhynchus Bhattacharya, 2007
Echinorhynchinae Cobbold, 1879
Acanthocephalus Koelreuther, 1771
Brasacanthus Thatcher, 2001
Echinorhynchus Zoega in Müller, 1776
Frilloechinorhynchus Bhattacharya, 2007
Solearhynchus de Buron & Maillard, 1985
Incertae sedis
Neoacanthocephaloides Cable & Quick, 1954
Pseudoacanthocephalus Petrochenko, 1958 - This genus parasitizes amphibians and reptiles globally.
Pseudoacanthocephalus goodmani was found infesting Sclerophrys gutturalis, an invasive species on the island of Mauritius.
Pseudoacanthocephalus lutzi was found infesting cane toad in the Americas.
Pseudoacanthocephalus nickoli was found infesting Sanguirana luzonensis and Hylarana similis on Luzon Island, Philippines.
Pseudoacanthocephalus smalesi was found infesting Sphenomorphus abdictus on Luzon Island, Philippines.

In 2019, Kvach & de Buron added to the family a new species, Harpagorhynchus golvaneuzeti, which represents a new genus, Harpagorhynchus and a new subfamily, the Harpagorhynchinae. The specific epithet refers to two famous French parasitologists, Yves-Jean Golvan and Louis Euzet.

References

 
Echinorhynchida
Acanthocephala families
Taxa named by Thomas Spencer Cobbold